Shalim Ortiz (born February 26, 1979) is a Puerto Rican actor and singer.

Personal life
Ortiz is the son of Dominican singer, actress, and host Charytín Goyco and Puerto Rican actor and comedian Elín Ortiz. Ortiz married Leslie Ann Machado in 2008. The couple welcomed a son in 2009 and later welcomed twins sons in 2016 before divorcing in 2017. Ortiz and Machado divorced in 2017 and Ortiz began dating actress Thanya López in 2018.

Television
In 2007, Ortiz starred as Miguel in the romantic, web-only series "Engaged" and also portrayed Alejandro Herrera on Heroes. His character was killed in the penultimate episode of the second season. He guest starred in an episode of Cory in the House as Bahavian singer Nanoosh.  He also is featured in the Hallmark Channel movie Expecting a Miracle, which first premiered January 10, 2009.

Shalim has also guest-starred in mainstream series such as Cold Case (TV series) and CSI Miami.

He was also part of Maneater (2009 miniseries) for Lifetime (TV network) as Pablo.

in 2012 Shalim joined the cast of Una Maid en Manhattan for NBC-Telemundo as engineer Frank Varela who fought for the love of Marisa, played by Litzy

Film
Recently he has been involved in a film project that also stars Robert Miano, Leo Fong and Raymond Forchion.

Filmography

Film

Television roles

International tour
In 2003 and 2004, Ortiz completed a world tour that included stops in Europe and in South America. He is also an advocate of the American Diabetes Association; his father Elin had diabetes. Ortiz has also become a spokesman of the ADA for the Hispanic population of the United States.

Discography
Shalim
Cuarto sin Puerta

See also
List of people from the Dominican Republic
List of Puerto Ricans

References

External links

1979 births
Living people
21st-century Puerto Rican male singers
Puerto Rican people of Dominican Republic descent
Puerto Rican male film actors
Puerto Rican male television actors
Male actors from San Juan, Puerto Rico
21st-century American male actors
Singers from San Juan, Puerto Rico